Crestview is a census-designated place (CDP) in McKinley County, New Mexico, United States. It was first listed as a CDP prior to the 2020 census.

The community is in the western part of the county, bordered to the north by Williams Acres. Interstate 40 forms the northern border of the Crestview CDP, with the closest access one mile to the east at Exit 16 (NM 118) in Gallup.

The CDP drains to Twin Buttes Wash, a north-flowing tributary of the Puerco River, part of the Little Colorado River watershed.

Demographics

Education
It is in Gallup-McKinley County Public Schools.

Zoned schools are: Stagecoach Elementary School, Chief Manualito Middle School, and Gallup High School.

References 

Census-designated places in McKinley County, New Mexico
Census-designated places in New Mexico